Zion is a given name and surname derived from the ancient Canaanite hill fortress in Jerusalem called the City of David. In Hebrew Zion is one of the 70 Names of Jerusalem. It is of Old English, Greek, and Hebrew origins.

Notable people with the given name "Zion" include

Zion Clark (born 1997), American wrestler
Zion Cohen (born 1983), Israeli footballer
Zion Evrony, Israeli diplomat
Zyon Gilbert (born 1999), American football player
Zion Golan (born 1955), Israeli singer
Zion Harmon (born 2002), American basketball player
Zion Johnson (born 1999), American football player
Zion Levy (1925–2008), Israeli rabbi
Zion Lights (born 1984), British-Indian activist
Zion Long (born 2003), Nigerian footballer
Zyon McCollum (born 1999), American football player
Zion McKinney (born 1958), American football player
Zion Merili (born 1957), Israeli footballer
Zión Moreno (born 1995), American actress
Zion Nelson (born 2001), American football player
Zion Nybeck (born 2002), Swedish ice hockey player
Zion Pinyan (born 1951), Israeli politician
Zion Suzuki (born 2002), Japanese footballer
Zion Tse, American professor
Zion Tupuola-Fetui (born 2000), American football player
Zion Tzemah (born 1990), Israeli footballer
Zion Williamson (born 2000), American basketball player
Zion Wright (born 1999), American skateboarder

Notable people with the surname "Zion" include

Daniel Zion (1883–1979), Turkish-Israeli rabbi
Gene Zion (1913–1975), American author
Jonathan Zion, Australian musician
Jonathan Zion (ice hockey) (born 1981), Canadian ice hockey player
Naor Zion (born 1973), Israeli comedian
Roger H. Zion (1921–2019), American politician and lawyer
Sidney Zion (1933–2009), American writer
William Zion (1872–1919), American soldier

See also
Zion (disambiguation), a disambiguation page for Zion

References 

Greek masculine given names
Hebrew masculine given names
English masculine given names